Aspelt is a small town in the commune of Frisange, in southern Luxembourg. In 2005, its population was 970.

Aspelt Castle in the centre of the town is a Baroque residence built in 1590 on the site of a medieval castle from the 11th century. There are now plans to renovate the building.

References

Frisange
Towns in Luxembourg